Patrick Allen (1927–2006) was a British actor.

Patrick Allen may also refer to:

Patrick Allen (music educator) (born 1955), English author
Patrick Allen (American football) (1961–2021), American football player
Patrick Allen (bowler) (born 1970), American ten-pin bowler
Patrick Allen (governor-general) (born 1951), Governor-General of Jamaica

See also
Patrick Allan (fl. 1911–1924), Scottish footballer
Allen Patrick (born 1984), American football player
Allen (surname)